Yanajasa (possibly from Quechua yana black, q'asa mountain pass) is a mountain in the Vilcanota mountain range in the Andes of Peru, about  high. It is located in the Cusco Region, Quispicanchi Province, Marcapata District. Yanajasa lies south of Ccolcce and Quishuarnioj between the Parina valley and the Sayapata valley.

References

Mountains of Cusco Region
Mountains of Peru